The student government president (sometimes called "student body president," "student council president" or "school president") is generally the highest-ranking officer of a student union. While a student government group and a class president are very similar to each other in some ways, the main difference between them is that while a class president represents a specific grade within the school, the student government president represents the school's entire student body (hence why they're sometimes called "student body president" or "school president").

Duties and powers
The authority and responsibility of Presidents vary according to their respective institutions. Students performing in this role typically serve a ceremonial and managerial purpose, as a spokesperson of the entire student body. The president may oversee his or her association's efforts on student activity events and planning, school policy support from students, budget allocation, fiscal planning, recognition of developing issues pertaining to students, and communication between faculty/staff and the student body.

Duties
Duties usually include working with students to resolve problems, informing school administration of ideas emanating from the student body, and managing the student government in the capacity of Chief Executive Officer.

In this role, they may make student appointments, campus-wide committees and boards, and may represent the institution to other associations or bodies. For example, the student government presidents within the University System of Georgia also serve on the statewide Student Advisory Council of Georgia.

Though supported by other officer positions (e.g. Vice President, Secretary, Treasurer, Social Chairperson etc.), a President is expected to gain knowledge of parliamentary procedure, and in most cases, Robert's Rules of Order.

In the United States, more than 70% of student government presidents are compensated.

Powers
Some schools vary in the powers for the president of their student governments, but many grant veto power to the individual over any act passed by the student senate/house of representatives at the collegiate level. Some student council constitutions and bylaws assign any powers not explicitly stated to the President.

Election
The office holder typically serves one school year in most schools but there are instances where the term length is 2 years, with the ability to serve more than one term. There are a handful of schools across the country where the length of a term is 3 years and has a two-term limit. However, there are increasing instances in schools were the term length is 2 years to place a two-term limit on the longevity of the possible tenure in office. Presidents, and sometimes their running mate, the Student Government Vice President, are generally elected via one of three methods:
 By a general election of the student body at-large
 By the student council, usually out of its own membership
 By the general student body, in elections held after the Student Council has been selected

In certain schools, over 50% of the vote or a margin of victory over 1% of the votes polled is required to be elected to the position. In case of a three way tie or a margin of victory less than 1%, the student council or the student House of Representatives elects the president via a majority vote. However, in case of a three way tie, the student council or the student house of representatives only considers the first and second place candidates for the position of President, a system similar to that of the national House of Representatives. The student council Vice President is chosen by the Student Senate, a similar system to the national Senate. In case of deadlock in the student house, the vice president is sworn in as acting president until the house chooses a president. If both the House and the Senate are tied or deadlocked, the speaker of the student house is sworn in as acting president until either branch picks someone. This system is modelled after the national system of resolving a tied election or a deadlocked election.

Successor
In democratic student government, the Vice President generally ascends to the position of President in the situation that the incumbent is unable to discharge his/her duties permanently, resigns, or is impeached and removed from office by a student council or senate (in a manner similar to that of the United States Government). In case of the occurrence of any of the above 2 months or less before the student government elections, the Vice President is sworn in as interim president, lacking the ability to make any drastic policy changes. In case of the vacancy of the office of the Vice President and the resignation, incapacitation or removal of the president, the speaker of the student House of Representatives is sworn in as the new President, upon whose ascension to the Class Presidency a new Speaker is elected via a majority vote (over 50% of the total votes cast) system. The confirmation of a student council Vice President a simple majority vote in both houses is required. Like the President, the Vice President can also be impeached and removed from office by simple majority in both the House and in the Senate and just like the President, the Vice President can also resign.

Notable student government presidents
Some former student government presidents have become notable at the national or even international level, for various reasons (e.g., political, social), such as:
 Sam Brownback, Kansas State University
 Eve Carson, UNC
 Larry Craig, U of Idaho
 Richard Nixon
 Reince Priebus, University of Wisconsin–Whitewater
 Ronald Reagan
 Robert Smith Vance, University of Alabama
 Hillary Clinton, Wellesley
 John Connally, Governor of Texas and friend of John F. Kennedy
 Lamar Alexander, U.S. Senator and former Secretary of the U.S. Department of Education
 Bruce Maloch, Southern Arkansas University, Arkansas State Senator
 Chris Christie, University of Delaware
 Andrew Gillum, Florida A&M University, Mayor of Tallahassee and Democratic Candidate for Governor of Florida
 Ramon Alexander, Florida A&M University, Representative in the Florida House of Representatives
 Sarah Huckabee Sanders, Ouachita Baptist University
 Jim Sears, major league football
 Halle Berry, actress
 Rosie O'Donnell, TV personality
 Shannen Doherty, actress

Famous presidential candidates for the Student Body
 Shannen Doherty
 Hillary Clinton
 Gerald Ford

Incidents involving student presidents
In December 2015, the Slog and the Seattle Times reported that a Western Washington University student had been arrested and released on bail after calling for the lynching of the student body president of the university. The racist threats were posted on Yik Yak.

See also
 American Student Government Association
 Massachusetts State Student Advisory Council
 Robert's Rules of Order
 School captain
 Student Advisory Council of Georgia
 Student council
 Union of Students in Ireland

Sources
 American Student Government Association

References

Titles
Student government